Mijanur Rahman (born 1958) is a Bangladeshi academician. He served as the 5th Vice-Chancellor of Jagannath University during 2013–2021.

Early life and career
Rahman was born in Comilla in 1958. He received his bachelor's degree in 1978 and master's degrees in 1979 in marketing from the University of Dhaka, followed by a  Ph.D. degree in business administration from Aligarh Muslim University in 1994. Earlier,  He completed his Bachelor of Commerce degree in 1978 and Master of Commerce in 1979 from marketing dept of DU.

Rahman was appointed as a professor in the Marketing Department of Dhaka University in 1999. He served as the treasurer of the same university from 2009 to 2012. He published books including "Bazarjatkaran", "Snatak Bazarjatkaran", "Bazarjatkaran Nitimala" and "Bazarjatkaran". 

Rahman was appointed vice-chancellor of Jagannath University on March 20, 2013. He was reappointed to the position for another four-year term on March 19, 2017.

References

Living people
1958 births
People from Comilla
Academic staff of Jagannath University
Aligarh Muslim University alumni
University of Dhaka alumni
Academic staff of the University of Dhaka
Date of birth missing (living people)